The following list is a complete collection of results for the Fiji Bati.

Results

 Fiji def. Papua New Guinea 22–20 (9 November 2019)
 Fiji def. Samoa 18–44 (2 November 2019)
 Fiji def. Lebanon 58–14 (22 June 2019)
 Papua New Guinea def. Fiji 26–14 (23 June 2018)
 Australia def. Fiji 54–6 (24 November 2017)
 Fiji def. New Zealand 4–2 (18 November 2017)
 Fiji def. Italy 38–10 (10 November 2017)
 Fiji def. Wales 72–6 (5 November 2017)
 Fiji def. USA 58–12 (28 October 2017)
 Tonga def. Fiji 26–24  (6 May 2017)
 Fiji def. Samoa 20–18 (8 October 2016)
 Papua New Guinea def. Fiji 24–22 (24 May 2016)
 Fiji def. Papua New Guinea 22–10 (2 May 2015)
 Fiji def. Lebanon 40–28 (19 October 2014)
 Australia def. Fiji 64–0 (23 November 2013)
 Fiji def. Samoa 22–4 (15 November 2013)
 England def. Fiji 34–12 (9 November 2013)
 Australia def. Fiji 34–2 (2 November 2013)
 Fiji def. Ireland 32–14 (28 October 2013)
 Fiji def. Samoa 24–4 (2 June 2010)
 Fiji def. Tonga 26–16 (31 October 2009)
 Cook Islands def. Fiji 24–22 (24 October 2009)
 Australia def. Fiji 52–0 (16 November 2008)
 Fiji def. Ireland 30–14 (10 November 2008)
 Fiji def. France 42–6 (1 November 2008)
 Tonga def. Fiji 14–12  (19 October 2007)
 Junior Kangaroos def Fiji 15–14 (5 October 2007)
 Fiji def. Cook Islands 58–12 (26 January 2007)
 Fiji 40 def. Cook Islands 4 (7 October 2006)
 Fiji 30 def. Tonga 28 (4 October 2006)
 Samoa 30 def. Fiji 28 29 September 2006)
 Tonga def. Fiji 22–4 (2006)
 Fiji def. Cook Islands 40–18 (2006)
 Fiji def. Samoa 26–4 (2006)
 Fiji tied Cook Islands 20–20 (February 2005)
 Fiji def. Niue 34–24 (23 October 2004)
 Cook Islands def. Fiji 20–12 (21 October 2004)
 Tonga def. Fiji 56–6 (17 October 2004)
 Cook Islands def. Fiji 36–24 (17 August 2004)
 Fiji def. England "A" 44–8 (11 November 2002)
 England def. Fiji 66–4 (4 November 2000)
 Australia def. Fiji 66–8 (1 November 2000)
 Fiji def. Russia 38–12 (29 October 2000)
 Fiji def. Tonga 10–6 (3 June 2000)
 Tonga def. Fiji 23–20 (27 May 2000)
 New Zealand Māoris def. Fiji 70–0 (29 April 2000)
 New Zealand Māoris def. Fiji 28–12 (25 April 2000)
 New Zealand Māoris def. Fiji 44–14 (22 April 2000)
 Fiji def. Samoa 30–4 (1999)
 Fiji def. Samoa 22–16 (1999)
 Samoa def. Fiji 6–1 (1999)
 Papua New Guinea def. Fiji 16–14 (1998)
 Papua New Guinea def. Fiji 34–12 (1998)
 Fiji def. Papua New Guinea 14–10 (1998)
 Fiji def. Tonga 22–14 (1998)
 Cook Islands def. Fiji 22–14 (1997)
 New Zealand Māoris def. Fiji 32–22 (1997)
 Fiji drew with Tonga 14–14 (1997)
 Fiji drew with Tonga 22–22 (1997)
 Australia def. NRL of Fiji 84–14 (1996)
 Fiji def. Cook Islands 14–8 (1996)
 Great Britain def. Fiji 72–4 (5 October 1996)
 Australia def. Fiji 66–0 (14 October 1995)
 England def. Fiji 46–0 (11 October 1995)
 Fiji def. South Africa 52–6 (8 October 1995)
 Fiji def. France 20–12 (9 July 1994)
 Papua New Guinea def. Fiji 35–24 (1993)
 Fiji def. Cook Islands 54–6 (1992)
 Tonga def. Fiji 23–20 (1992)
 Niue def. Fiji 14–10 (1992)
 Western Samoa def. Fiji 32–18 (1992)

See also

Fiji National Rugby League Competition
Fiji women's national rugby league team
Fiji National Rugby League
Rugby league in Fiji

References

External links
 Google–Video
 Fiji Rugby League Fans Forums – RugbyLeague.org
 2008 Rugby League World Cup Site

Fiji national rugby league team
Rugby league in Fiji
Rugby league-related lists
Pacific Cup